A pandy is a Welsh name for a fulling mill, and may refer to:

Places in Wales
 Pandy, Bryn-crug, a location in Gwynedd
 Pandy, Dolgellau, a location in Gwynedd
 Pandy, Llanuwchllyn, a location in Gwynedd
 Pandy, Conwy, an electoral ward near Llanfairfechan, Conwy
 Pandy Tudur, a village in Conwy
 Pandy, Monmouthshire, a village near Abergavenny
 Pandy, Powys, a village in Powys
 Pandy, Ceiriog Valley, a village between Glyn Ceiriog and Llanarmon Dyffryn Ceiriog
 Pandy, Gwersyllt, a village near Gresford and Wrexham
 Pandy, Hanmer, a hamlet near Halghton, English Maelor, Wrexham

Other uses
 András Pándy (1927-2013), Belgian-Hungarian serial killer

See also
 Andy Pandy, a British children's television series
 Pandya dynasty, ancient Indian dynasty of southern India
 Pandya (surname), Indian surname